John A. McLean was a Scottish amateur footballer who made 100 appearances in the Scottish League for Queen's Park as an outside right.

Personal life 
McLean served as a gunner in the Royal Field Artillery during the First World War.

Career statistics

References

1881 births
Scottish footballers
Scottish Football League players
British Army personnel of World War I
Association football outside forwards
Queen's Park F.C. players
Royal Field Artillery soldiers
Place of death missing
Date of death missing
People from Govan
Ayr Parkhouse F.C. players